La Tola is a town and municipality in the Nariño Department, Colombia.

Climate
La Tola has a tropical rainforest climate (Köppen Af) with heavy to very heavy rainfall year-round.

References

Municipalities of Nariño Department